Eugene Timothy Bassett (April 1, 1951 – December 9, 2018) was an American basketball player. He was a staff member for the charitable group Heroes and Cool Kids.

Playing career
Bassett played for the University of Georgia.

He was selected by the Buffalo Braves in the seventh round (106th pick overall) of the 1973 NBA draft, and by the San Diego Conquistadors in the second round of the 1973 ABA Supplemental Draft.

He played for the San Diego Conquistadors (1973–1975) and New York Nets (1975–1976) in the American Basketball Association (ABA). After the 1976 ABA–NBA merger, he played for the Nets (1976–1979) and the San Antonio Spurs (1979–1980) in the National Basketball Association (NBA) for 473 games.

Post-playing career
Bassett was a staff member for the charitable group Heroes and Cool Kids centered in the New Jersey-New York urban area. The program focuses on spreading positive messages to young students in the fifth and sixth grades and uses high-school students to help carry out its program. Their website specifically states of its goals being to spread skills such as "sportsmanship, conflict resolution, and positive lifestyle choices highlighting drug, alcohol, and tobacco prevention."

Bassett died from cancer on December 9, 2018.

ABA/NBA career statistics

Regular season

|-
| style="text-align:left;"|
| style="text-align:left;"|San Diego (ABA)
| 82 || – || 22.6 || .467 || .000 || .593 || 7.3 || 1.3 || 0.7 || 0.4 || 6.9
|-
| style="text-align:left;"|
| style="text-align:left;"|San Diego (ABA)
| 72 || – || 27.8 || .471 || .750 || .562 || 7.3 || 1.6 || 0.6 || 0.5 || 8.0
|-
| style="text-align:left;background:#afe6fa;"|†
| style="text-align:left;"|New York (ABA)
| 84 || – || 21.3 || .437 || .167 || .592 || 6.3 || 0.8 || 0.6 || 0.5 || 4.8
|-
| style="text-align:left;"|
| style="text-align:left;"|N.Y. Nets
| 76 || – || 32.1 || .396 || – || .571 || 8.4 || 1.4 || 1.3 || 0.7 || 9.0
|-
| style="text-align:left;"|
| style="text-align:left;"|New Jersey
| 65 || – || 22.7 || .388 || – || .515 || 6.2 || 1.0 || 1.0 || 0.5 || 5.4
|-
| style="text-align:left;"|
| style="text-align:left;"|New Jersey
| 82 || – || 18.4 || .371 || – || .679 || 5.1 || 1.2 || 0.5 || 0.4 || 3.9
|-
| style="text-align:left;"|
| style="text-align:left;"|New Jersey
| 7 || – || 13.1 || .364 || – || .667 || 2.6 || 0.6 || 0.7 || 0.0 || 3.4
|-
| style="text-align:left;"|
| style="text-align:left;"|San Antonio
| 5 || – || 14.4 || .333 || – || .667 || 3.0 || 2.0 || 0.6 || 0.0 || 2.0
|- class="sortbottom"
| style="text-align:center;" colspan="2"|Career
| 473 || – || 23.7 || .423 || .286 || .588 || 6.7 || 1.2 || 0.8 || 0.5 || 6.2

Playoffs

|-
|style="text-align:left;"|1974
|style="text-align:left;"|San Diego (ABA)
|6||–||40.7||.519||–||.667||14.8||3.3||0.5||1.2||14.7
|-
| style="text-align:left;background:#afe6fa;"|1976†
|style="text-align:left;"|New York (ABA)
|13||–||24.0||.457||.000||.727||7.2||0.7||0.5||0.5||6.3
|-
|style="text-align:left;"|1979
|style="text-align:left;"|New Jersey
|2||–||8.5||.400||–||1.000||1.0||0.0||0.0||0.0||3.0
|-
|style="text-align:left;"|1980
|style="text-align:left;"|San Antonio
|3||–||6.3||.500||–||–||0.3||0.0||0.0||0.0||0.7
|- class="sortbottom"
| style="text-align:center;" colspan="2"|Career
| 24 || – || 24.7 || .485 || .000 || .720 || 7.7 || 1.2 || 0.4 || 0.6 || 7.4

References

External links
 
 Hine, Chris. "From His Manhattan Nightspot, Bassett Recalls Old Days," The New York Times, Sunday, September 27, 2009.

1951 births
2018 deaths
African-American basketball players
American expatriate basketball people in Italy
American men's basketball players
Basketball players from Washington, D.C.
Buffalo Braves draft picks
Centers (basketball)
Georgia Bulldogs basketball players
New Jersey Nets announcers
New Jersey Nets players
New York Nets players
Pallacanestro Varese players
Power forwards (basketball)
San Antonio Spurs players
San Diego Conquistadors players
Southern Idaho Golden Eagles men's basketball players
20th-century African-American sportspeople
21st-century African-American people